The 1942 Alabama gubernatorial election took place on November 3, 1942, to elect the governor of Alabama. Incumbent Democrat Frank M. Dixon was term limited, and could not seek a second consecutive term.

Democratic primary
At the time this election took place, Alabama, as with most other southern states, was solidly Democratic, and the Republican Party had such diminished influence that the Democratic primary was the de facto contest for state offices.

Candidates
 W. O. Broyle
 H. J. Carwile
 Jim Folsom, businessman
 Christopher J. Sherlock
 Chauncey Sparks, former State Representative and candidate for governor in 1938

Results

Results

References

1942
gubernatorial
Alabama
November 1942 events